Bibi Fricotin, is a French comedy film from 1951, directed by Marcel Blistène, written by Arthur Harfaux, and starring Maurice Baquet. It was based on the popular French comic strip series Bibi Fricotin.

Cast 
 Maurice Baquet: Bibi Fricotin
 Colette Darfeuil: Mrs Suzy Fatma
 Nicole Francis: Catherine
 Alexandre Rignault: Mr Tartazan
 Paul Demange: the museum's curator
 Yves Robert: Antoine Gardon
 Milly Mathis: Mrs Tartazan (Catherine's aunt)
 Jacques Famery: a reporter
 Louis de Funès (uncredited)

See also
 Bibi Fricotin

References

External links 
 
 Bibi Fricotin (1951) at the Films de France

1951 films
French comedy films
1950s French-language films
French black-and-white films
Films based on French comics
Live-action films based on comics
1951 comedy films
1950s French films